Alykel International Airport  is a large international airport in Krasnoyarsk Krai, Russia, located  west of Norilsk. Alykel is the only functional airfield near Norilsk. It handles medium-sized aircraft and is serviced by 24-hour operations. Since it is capable of handling wide-body jets, it is a diversion airport on Polar route 1. Since Norilsk does not have road or railroad connections to the rest of the country, the airport is the main gateway to the city.

This allowed the use of Norilsk as a staging base for Soviet bombers to reach the United States. This role continues to this day, with caretaker status provided by the Russian Air Force's OGA (Arctic Control Group). Norilsk also was served by interceptor aircraft under the 57 IAP (57th Guards Red Banner Fighter Aviation Regiment PVO), which in 1991 had 24 Sukhoi Su-15TM aircraft. 

The airport received international status on 1 February 2023.

Airlines and destinations

Passenger

Accidents and incidents
 On 16 November 1981, Aeroflot Flight 3603, a Tupolev Tu-154, crashed while attempting to land at Norilsk Airport. Ninety-nine of the 167 passengers and crew on board were killed in the accident.

Rail link to airport 

An electrified rail link Norilsk-Oktyabrskaya - Airport was operated from 1967-11-22 to 1998.

References

External links

Soviet Air Force bases
Russian Air Force bases
Soviet Air Defence Force bases
Airports built in the Soviet Union
Airports in Krasnoyarsk Krai
Norilsk